Morante is a surname. Notable people with the surname include:

Daniele Morante (born 1979), Italian footballer
Eduardo Morante (born 1987), Ecuadorian footballer
Elsa Morante (1912–1985), Italian writer
Laura Morante (born 1956), Italian actress
Massimo Morante (1950–2022), Italian musician
Valentín Galarza Morante (1882–1951), Spanish military officer and politician

Italian-language surnames